Mohammed Omar Bedour (born 2000), is a Jordanian swimmer.  He competed at the 2015 World Aquatics Championships in  the Men's 100 metre freestyle, Men's 100 metre backstroke, 4 × 100 metre mixed freestyle relay and 4 × 100 metre mixed medley relay. re,

References

External links 
Mohammed Omar Moh'd Bedour profile - Eurosport

2000 births
Jordanian male swimmers
Living people
Swimmers at the 2018 Asian Games
Swimmers at the 2018 Summer Youth Olympics
Asian Games competitors for Jordan
Jordanian male freestyle swimmers
Male backstroke swimmers
21st-century Jordanian people